The 1975–76 Cypriot First Division was the 37th season of the Cypriot top-level football league.

Overview
It was contested by 15 teams, and AC Omonia won the championship.

League standings

Results

References
Cyprus - List of final tables (RSSSF)

Cypriot First Division seasons
Cypriot First Division, 1975-76
1975–76 in Cypriot football